Mahjong is a strategy-based tile game developed during the Qing dynasty in China. It has since spread worldwide. The game has a long history and significance in many countries, particularly in Asia. Places like China and Japan have especially strong cultural ties to the game. In China, the game has evolved to represent peace and friendship. Inviting someone to a game of Mahjong is almost synonymous with friendship. Expensive Mahjong sets can be seen as a status symbol and are a source of pride among Chinese families.

Hong Kong
In Hong Kong:
During a Chinese wedding banquet, guests play Mahjong during the waiting time.
A count-down Mahjong before the Chinese New Year or the New Year is a typical practice for many Hong Kong families.
While most people have a Mahjong set at home, most Chinese restaurants offer sets of Mahjong equipment for their customers.
Officially, casinos are illegal in Hong Kong. However, there are legal Mahjong schools, where gamblers can play Mahjong.
The elderly are encouraged to play Mahjong as brain exercise.
To invite a person to a Mahjong game is an indication of friendliness in Chinese Culture.

However, Mahjong games also create problems. Addiction to Mahjong is a common type of problem gambling. Mahjong is also a favourite medium for bribery - the person giving the bribe will intentionally lose large sums of money to the person being bribed. Recent studies also suggest Mahjong can cause epilepsy

See also
Gambling in Hong Kong
Mahjong

References

Mahjong
Chinese culture
Entertainment in Hong Kong
Gambling in Hong Kong